A by-election for the seat of Roebourne in the Legislative Assembly of Western Australia was held on 6 February 1932. It was triggered by the death of Frederick Teesdale (the sitting Nationalist member) on 14 December 1931.

The election was considered to be of great importance to the government of Sir James Mitchell, as a loss to the Labor Party would reduce his Nationalist–Country coalition to minority government. John Church, a 72-year-old pastoralist, was one of two candidates fielded by the Nationalist Party, and won the election with 56.42 percent of the two-party-preferred vote. He defeated five other candidates, including four who polled more than 10 percent on first preferences, and became the oldest person to win election to parliament in Western Australia for the first time.

Background
Frederick Teesdale had held Roebourne for the Nationalist Party since the 1917 state election, generally with a large majority (and on one occasion running unopposed). He died at his home in Perth on 14 December 1931, having suffered from tuberculosis for two years. The writ for the by-election was issued on 17 December, with the close of nominations on 11 January. Polling day was on 6 February, with the writ returned on 15 February.

Results

Notes

Aftermath
Church held Roebourne for just over a year, losing the seat to Aloysius Rodoreda by 23 votes in the Labor landslide at the 1933 state election. Rodoreda remained in parliament until his death in 1958, transferring to the seat of Pilbara when Roebourne was abolished at the 1950 election.

See also
 1973 Balcatta state by-election, held in similar circumstances
 List of Western Australian state by-elections

References

Western Australian state by-elections
1932 elections in Australia
February 1932 events
1930s in Western Australia